Schubert's birthplace (Schubert Geburtshaus), in Vienna, Austria, was the birthplace in 1797 of the composer Franz Schubert. Today it is a museum, part of the Vienna Museum.

Description

History
Their son Franz was born here on 31 January 1797; he was the twelfth of fourteen children, of whom five survived infancy. The family lived here until 1801, when they moved to their own house in Säulengasse, a short distance away.

Museum
A large part of the top floor is now a museum dedicated to the composer. It documents his life and musical development, and his circle of friends. There are several portraits of the composer, including those by Wilhelm August Rieder, Moritz von Schwind and Leopold Kupelwieser.

The building also houses the Stifter memorial rooms, exhibiting about fifty paintings by the writer and painter Adalbert Stifter (1805–1868).

See also 
 List of music museums
 List of museums in Vienna

References

Birthplaces of individual people
Franz Schubert
Museums in Vienna
Music museums in Austria
Biographical museums in Austria